Dunmore is an unincorporated community in Pocahontas County, West Virginia, United States. Dunmore has a post office with ZIP code 24934.

Some say the community has the name of the Earl of Dunmore, while others believe the place name is an amalgamation of Dunkum and Moore, early owners of the town site.

Climate
The climate in this area has mild differences between highs and lows, and there is adequate rainfall year-round.  According to the Köppen Climate Classification system, Dunmore has a marine west coast climate, abbreviated "Cfb" on climate maps.

References

Unincorporated communities in Pocahontas County, West Virginia
Unincorporated communities in West Virginia